Amartha Hangtuah is a basketball club based in Jakarta, Indonesia that plays in the National Basketball League.

League

Roster

Rookie Binaan
-Mikail Jadyra dan Saddam Asyruna

Awards 
Rookie of the Year : 

 Abraham Wenas (2018)

Notable coaches
- Set a club record or won an individual award as a professional coach.
- Functioned as head coach for any senior national team at least once at an official international match.

 Johannis Winar

References

Basketball teams established in 1995
Basketball teams in Indonesia
Sport in Jakarta
1995 establishments in Indonesia